Engalitcheff may refer to:
Nicholas Engalitcheff (1874–1935), Russian diplomat
Engalitcheff Institute on Comparative Political and Economic Systems at The Fund for American Studies

See also
Pavel Yengalychev
Engalychev